Hans-Jürgen Papier (born 6 July 1943 in Berlin) is a German scholar of constitutional law and was President of the Federal Constitutional Court of Germany from 2002 to 2010.

Three years after graduating from law school in 1967 with the first law state examination, Papier completed his Ph.D. studies at the Freie Universität Berlin. In 1971 he received the second law state examination. In 1973 he received his Habilitation on the basis of a second dissertation on questions concerning German constitutional law.

From 1974 onward Papier received tenure at the Universität Bielefeld and taught constitutional law. In 1992 he moved to Munich to teach German and Bavarian constitutional and administrative law as well as Public Social law at the Ludwig-Maximilians-Universität.

In 1998 Papier, a member of the conservative CSU party, became Vice President and Chair of the First Senate of the Federal Constitutional Court of Germany. When President of the Federal Constitutional Court of Germany Jutta Limbach retired from her position in 2002, Papier succeeded her.

Papier has often made public comments on questions of constitutional law, but has generally avoided commenting on other political questions. He made an exception to this rule after the elections of 2005 when he implored the parties to work hard not to lose the trust of the German electorate.

Selected works
 Verfassung und Verfassungswandel, in: Robertson-von Trotha, Caroline Y. (ed.): 60 Jahre Grundgesetz. Interdisziplinäre Perspektiven (= Kulturwissenschaft interdisziplinär/Interdisciplinary Studies on Culture and Society, Vol. 4), Baden-Baden 2009

External links

1943 births
German scholars of constitutional law
Living people
Huguenots
Justices of the Federal Constitutional Court
Grand Crosses 1st class of the Order of Merit of the Federal Republic of Germany